The 1988 Tooheys 1000 was a 1000 km endurance motor race for Group A Touring Cars. It was held on 2 October 1988 at the Mount Panorama Circuit just outside Bathurst in New South Wales, Australia. The race was the opening round of the 1988 Asia-Pacific Touring Car Championship and was the 29th running of the Bathurst 1000. 

The 1988 edition was the only race in the history of the Bathurst 1000 to have commenced with a rolling start.

Controversy
On the Friday afternoon immediately at the close of final qualifying, Holden Special Vehicles driver Tom Walkinshaw lodged a formal protest against the leading Australian Ford Sierras, targeting all three Dick Johnson Racing (DJR) cars, along with the Tony Longhurst and Colin Bond entries. No European-built Fords (or those with some European build/driver connection) were protested, Walkinshaw claiming it was only the Australian cars as they were the fastest, despite the presence of the Eggenberger Motorsport built Allan Moffat ANZ Sierra as fourth fastest qualifier (faster than Bond and the third DJR entry). Also left alone in the protest was the Sierra of teammates Andrew Miedecke (fifth in a car with a technical link to Andy Rouse, while Miedecke's co-driver at Bathurst was Steve Soper) and Andrew Bagnall (seventh set by co-driver Pierre Dieudonné), and the Team CMS Sweden Sierra (tenth).

The feeling among the protested Australian Sierra teams was that the protest was designed to severely disrupt their race preparations, with only Longhurst's team able to get their Sierra somewhere near its pre-protest speed. All three teams had to pull their cars' engines and suspension apart after Friday's qualifying for the scrutineers before having to put them back together again before Saturday's Tooheys Top Ten. This was particularly disruptive for Dick Johnson's team as they had all three of their cars protested, despite the #18 car only qualifying 12th compared to Johnson's pole and John Bowe in second. The protest prompted DJR team owner Johnson to say at a press conference that Walkinshaw would "Protest against the cut in his bagpipes if he could" and that "All he wants to do is win and he doesn't care how he does it".

The Walkinshaw protest was countered by DJR team manager Neal Lowe who protested the three HSV team Holden Commodores, calling on his knowledge of the Commodore from his time with the old Holden Dealer Team in 1986. The counter-protest by DJR focused on the front air dam, steering rack and the size of the rear spoiler on only the factory backed Commodores.

On race day, Walkinshaw advised the Australian Racing Drivers Club (ARDC) and FISA officials that should one of the protested cars win the race, his protest against that car was to be immediately withdrawn. His reasons given for this was so that the winner would be known on the day rather than months later, as had been the case with the 1987 race.

Ultimately the Walkinshaw protests were found to be invalid and was dismissed. The HSV team cars had been entered by Perkins Engineering and not by TWR, therefore the Scot had no authority to lodge a protest and the stewards of the meeting erred in allowing it to proceed, though all of the Sierras were eventually cleared by FISA. However, the damage was done to the leading Australian Fords and it was only race winners Tony Longhurst Racing who managed to get their car back up to speed after being dismantled by scrutineers on the Friday before the Top Ten run off.

In an ironic twist, the DJR protest against two of the three HSV team cars (only the Perkins built cars and not the TWR British built Walkinshaw/Jeff Allam car) was successful with the modifications made to the cars steering racks found to be illegal. Ultimately the Australian Racing Drivers Club saw no need to change the results to show the cars as disqualified as the spare HSV Car (#40) was only driven in Wednesday's practice session, while the Larry Perkins/Denny Hulme/Walkinshaw #10 car, as well as the #20 Walkinshaw/Allam car both failed to finish. The fact that the Perkins built cars were disqualified and the Sierras were cleared raised some eyebrows as during the 1988 Australian Touring Car Championship Larry Perkins had been vocal that the Sierras were running illegally and was pushing for CAMS to enforce the rules.

Race summary
The 1988 race, under the first time sponsorship of Tooheys Brewery, was won by Tony Longhurst and Tomas Mezera driving a Ford Sierra RS500. It was the first victory in the "Bathurst 1000" for a turbocharged vehicle, and the first victory by a four-cylinder car since Bob Holden and Rauno Aaltonen won in a Morris Cooper S in 1966. It was also the only time in the race's history that there was a rolling start, as dictated by FISA regulations, rather than the traditional standing start. The Ford Sierras dominated the race as expected, but reliability had plagued the Fords. Several that had led the race retired, however sufficient examples finished to fill the three podium positions. Second was the last survivor of the three-car Dick Johnson Racing team, driven by former factory Toyota racer John Smith and DJR lead drivers Dick Johnson and John Bowe whose own hastily re-built cars had both failed early. Alfredo Costanzo qualified in the #18 DJR Sierra but did not get to race, as Johnson and Bowe took over that car. Third was the Caltex-sponsored Sierra of Colin Bond and  Formula One World Champion Alan Jones. The Caltex Sierra had to survive the Walkinshaw protest and post race disqualification (later overruled) to be finally classified third in December 1988. Indeed, it was Bond who successfully argued that Walkinshaw had no authority to lodge the original protest. Unfortunately for Bond, as a result of the protest his car had lost what the team considered to be their best turbocharger and they were forced to use their spare engine for the race which was reported to be some  down on their main rivals putting their race speed at around the same level as the leading Commodore's which was around 3–4 seconds per lap slower than they had been expecting.

Defending race winners Peter Brock, David Parsons and Peter McLeod all failed to finish the race. Brock and Parsons, driving BMW M3s for Brock's Mobil 1 Racing, were both out with engine trouble just after halfway through the race. It had been hoped by the team that the reliability shown by the BMW's in the European Touring Car Championship against the much faster, but still relatively fragile Ford Sierras would see them leading late in the race. Ironically the reverse was true and it was the factory backed BMW's which proved fragile. McLeod, driving one of the new Holden Commodores (built by Brock) with Melbourne solicitor Jim Keogh, was out with engine failure on lap 7. It was the team's second engine failure of the day having lost their race engine in the Sunday morning warmup session forcing the team into a rapid engine change that saw them start the race from pit lane. It was a cruel blow for the McLeod team after both McLeod and Keogh had crashed during practice and qualifying, but work on the car and a Saturday night change of setup had seen McLeod lap over one second faster in the race morning warmup than either driver had managed in qualifying.

Class 2 was won by the BMW M3 of New Zealand's Trevor Crowe and "Captain" Peter Janson who finished a strong fourth outright. Class 3, for cars up to 1600cc, was predictably won by the Toyota Team Australia Corolla GT of John Faulkner and Drew Price who finished ninth outright after an all-day sprint. This marked the first time that a small capacity class car had finished in the top ten at Bathurst since 1978.

The race saw the 18th and last start for 1983 James Hardie 1000 winner John Harvey. He drove a Holden Commodore with fellow Sydney veteran and 1974 race winner Kevin Bartlett to finish in 14th place.

Class structure
Cars competed in three engine capacity classes.

Class 1

For cars of over 2500cc engine capacity, it featured the turbocharged Ford Sierras, Nissan Skylines and Mitsubishi Starions, the V8 Holden Commodores and a BMW 635 CSi.

Class 2
For cars of 1601-2500cc engine capacity, it was composed of BMW M3s and a Mercedes-Benz 190E.

Class 3
For cars of up to 1600cc engine capacity, it was composed exclusively of various models of Toyota Corolla.

Tooheys Dozen
Due to FISA regulations the Top 10 run-off was not for Pole Position in 1988, but only for AUD$40,000 in prizemoney. With the exception of 2022, this was the only time since the run off began as Hardies Heroes in 1978 that the top 10 grid positions had not been decided in the run off. As a result, the Australian Racing Drivers Club invited non-top 10 qualifiers and former race winners Allan Grice (Holden Commodore – 11th) and Peter Brock (BMW M3 – 16th) to participate.

After 10 years of being known as "Hardies Heroes", the name of the runoff was changed to the "Tooheys Top 10" (dozen for 1988) to go along with new race sponsor Tooheys Brewery.

* 9th fastest qualifier George Fury used the #15 Nissan Skyline as co-driver Mark Skaife had crashed the #30 car in practice and it was still being repaired at the time of the Top 10. This was only allowed as the Top 10 didn't count for grid positions.* Fury and former Volvo factory driver, Swedish train driver Ulf Granberg were the only drivers to actually go faster than their qualifying times.* Jim Richards set the qualifying time of 2:23.76 in the #56 Mobil 1 Racing BMW M3, but Peter Brock drove the car in the runoff. Predictably in the underpowered, naturally aspirated 4 cyl BMW, Brock was the slowest in the runoff with a time over 2.2 seconds slower than 11th placed Allan Grice.* Klaus Niedzwiedz became the second West German driver in succession to win the runoff after his Eggenberger teammate Klaus Ludwig had won in 1987. Driving Allan Moffat's Eggenberger built Ford Sierra RS500, Niedzwiedz's time of 2:18.24 was 1.28 seconds slower than Ludwig's 1987 time, but it was 2.72 seconds faster than he had gone in the 1987 runoff.* As the shootout was not for grid positions, Tom Walkinshaw withdrew the #10 HSV Holden VL Commodore SS Group A SV of Larry Perkins (who was suffering from the flu). Its place was to be taken by the Mitsubishi Starion Turbo of 1986 pole winner Gary Scott. However, a determined Perkins was re-included and the Starion was removed from the list at the last minute.* Allan Grice had an unconventional start to his shootout lap, using the escape road at Murrays Corner to gain more speed along pit straight. It didn't work as his Les Small prepared Commodore finished 11th, 4/10ths slower than Perkins.

Official results

Italics indicate driver practiced in the car but did not race.

Statistics
 Pole Position – #17 Dick Johnson – 2:16.46
 Fastest Lap – #25 Tony Longhurst – 2:19.06 – Lap 4 (new lap record)
 Race time of winning car- 7:02:10.28
 Average Speed – 142.16  km/h

See also
1988 Australian Touring Car season

References

External links
 Tooheys 1000 Bathurst 1988, www.touringcarracing.net
 Tooheys 1000 – Mount Panorama, Bathurst – 2 October 1988, www.uniquecarsandparts.com.au
 Bathurst 1988, autopics.com.au

Motorsport in Bathurst, New South Wales
Tooheys 1000